The canton of Pézenas is an administrative division of the Hérault department, southern France. Its borders were modified at the French canton reorganisation which came into effect in March 2015. Its seat is in Pézenas.

Composition 

It consists of the following communes:

Abeilhan
Alignan-du-Vent
Castelnau-de-Guers
Caux
Coulobres
Florensac
Montblanc
Nézignan-l'Évêque
Pézenas
Pinet
Pomérols
Puissalicon
Saint-Thibéry
Tourbes
Valros

Councillors

Pictures of the canton

References 

Cantons of Hérault